The European Retrievable Carrier (EURECA) was an uncrewed 4.5-tonne satellite with 15 experiments. It was a European Space Agency (ESA) mission and the acronym was derived from Archimedes' bathtub revelation "Eureka!".

It was built by the German MBB-ERNO and had automatic material science cells as well as small telescopes for solar observation (including x-ray).

EURECA was retrieved on 1 July 1993 by  during STS-57 and returned to Earth. It was designed to fly five times with different experiments but the following flights were cancelled.

EURECA is one of the few uncrewed space vehicles that have been returned to the Earth unharmed. It has been on display at the Swiss Museum of Transport in Lucerne since 2000.

Design

EURECA was made of high-strength carbon-fiber struts and titanium nodal points joined together to form a framework of cubic elements. Thermal control on EURECA combined both active and passive heat transfer and radiation systems. Active heat transfer was achieved by means of a freon cooling loop which dissipated the thermal load through two radiators into space. The passive system made use of multilayer insulation blankets combined with electrical heaters.

The electrical subsystem was powered by deployable and retractable solar arrays together with four 40 amp-hour nickel-cadmium batteries. When EURECA was in the Shuttle cargo bay, power was supplied by the Shuttle. The modular attitude and orbit control subsystem (AOCS) maintained attitude and spacecraft orientation and stabilization.

EURECA was three-axis stabilized by means of a magnetic torque assembly together with a nitrogen reaction control assembly (RCA). Data handling was carried out by EURECAs data handling subsystem (DHS) supported by telemetry and command subsystems providing the link to the ground station.

Experiments
EURECA consisted of 15 experiments:
 Solution Growth Facility (SGF) (Belgium, Denmark, Norway) 
 Protein Crystallization Facility (PCF) (Germany) 
 Exobiology Radiation Assembly (ERA) (Germany) 
 Multi-Furnace Assembly (MFA) (Italy) 
 Automatic Mirror Furnace (AMF) (Germany) 
 Surface Forces Adhesion Instrument (SFA) (Italy) 
 High Precision Thermostat Instrument (HPT) (Germany) 
 Solar Constant and Variability Instrument (SOVA) (Belgium) 
 Solar Spectrum Instrument (SOSP) (France) 
 Occultation Radiometer Instrument (ORI) (Belgium) 
 Wide Angle Telescope for Cosmic Hard X-rays (WATCH) (Denmark) 
 Timeband Capture Cell Experiment (TICCE) (Great Britain) 
 Radio Frequency Ionization Thruster Assembly (RITA) (Germany) 
 Inter-Orbit Communications (IOC) (France/the Netherlands)  
 Advanced Solar Gallium Arsenide Array (ASGA) (Italy) 

The WATCH instrument observed Cosmic X-rays in an extremely wide field of view, a 65 degree range capable of observing 1/4 of the sky. The design is a Rotation Modulation Collimator, in which stripes of NaI(Tl) and CsI(Na) detectors make a phoswich.

Results
WATCH monitored about 25 X-rays sources over the whole sky over the course of the mission, as well as detecting 19 cosmic gamma ray bursts. Many of the gamma ray bursts were able to be localized to within 1 degree.

In the summer of 2016, EURECA was transported to the Swiss Federal Laboratories for Materials Science and Technology (Empa) in Dübendorf near Zurich where X-ray scans of the satellite were taken. The goal was to find out how EURECA's 11-month exposure to space had affected its structure and selected experiments it carried. EURECA was then brought back to the Swiss Museum of Transport in Lucerne and has since been exhibited in a new way, with both solar panels fully deployed for the first time.

See also

Long Duration Exposure Facility - NASA 1984-1990
Space Flyer Unit - Comparable Japanese spacecraft 1995-1996

References

External links

"Eureca - a satellite on the road (again)!" (Official YouTube channel for the X-ray examination of 2016)

Space telescopes
European Space Agency space probes
Space science experiments
European Space Agency satellites
Spacecraft launched by the Space Shuttle
Space hardware returned to Earth intact
Spacecraft launched in 1992